Owain ap Gruffydd, commonly known as Owain Glyndŵr or Glyn Dŵr (anglicised as Owen Glendower), was a Welsh leader, soldier and military commander who led a 15 year long Welsh War of Independence with the aim of ending English rule in Wales during the Late Middle Ages. Owain was an educated lawyer, forming the first Welsh Parliament under his rule, and was the last native-born Welshman to hold the title Prince of Wales.

In 1400, Owain Glyndŵr, a descendent of several Welsh royal dynasties, had a dispute with a neighbouring English lord that resulted in Glyndŵr claiming his ancestral title of Prince of Wales, instigating a 15 year Welsh Revolt against English rule. In response to the uprising, discriminatory penal laws were implemented against the Welsh people, effectively making them second class citizens, this deepened public unrest and significantly increased support for Glyndŵr across Wales. In 1404, after a series of successful castle sieges and several battlefield victories against the English, Owain gained control of the country and was officially crowned Prince of Wales in the presence of French, Spanish, Scottish and Breton envoys. He summoned a national parliament, where he announced plans to reintroduce the traditional Welsh laws of Hywel Dda, establish an independent Welsh church, and build two universities. Owain formed an alliance with King Charles VI of France: in 1405 a French army landed in Wales to support the rebellion. 

Under Owain Glyndŵr's leadership, an internationally recognised independent Welsh state was briefly established. It lasted for 5 years, until February 1409 when English forces captured Owain's last remaining strongholds of Aberystwyth Castle and Harlech Castle, effectively ending his territorial rule in Wales. Glyndŵr refused to surrender to the new King Henry V, ignoring two offers for a pardon from the monarch. He retreated to the Welsh hills and mountains with his remaining forces, where he continued to resist English rule by utilising guerrilla tactics. This continued until Owain disappeared in 1415, when one of his supporters, Adam of Usk, recorded that he died of natural causes.

The English named Glyndŵr a rebel, yet the Welsh created him a folk hero. As well as becoming a national hero, Glyndŵr has since been anointed as a legend in Welsh folklore. Despite the large bounty placed on him by the English crown, Glyndŵr was never betrayed or captured, and he acquired a mythical status along the likes of Cadwaladr, Cynon ap Clydno and King Arthur as a folk hero awaiting the call to return and liberate his people, "Y Mab Darogan" (The Foretold Son). In Shakespeare's Henry IV, Part 1 he appears as the king "Owen Glendower".

Early life

Owain Glyndŵr was born in 1354 in the northeast Welsh Marches (near the border between Wales and England) to a family of Uchelwyr – nobles descended from the pre-conquest native Welsh royal dynasties – in traditional Welsh society. This group moved easily between Welsh and English societies and languages, occupying important offices for the Marcher Lords while maintaining their position as Uchelwyr. His father, Gruffydd Fychan II, hereditary Tywysog of Powys Fadog and Lord of Glyndyfrdwy, died sometime before 1370, leaving Glyndŵr's mother Elen ferch Tomas ap Llywelyn of Deheubarth a widow when Owain was 16 years at most. Owain Glyndŵr was a direct descendant of several Welsh royal dynasties including the princes of Powys via the House of Mathrafal through his father. Through his mother, he was also a descendant of the kings and princes of the Kingdom of Deheubarth as well as the royal House of Dinefwr, and the kings and princes of the Kingdom of Gwynedd and their cadet branch of the House of Aberffraw.

The young Owain ap Gruffydd was possibly fostered at the home of David Hanmer, a rising lawyer shortly to be a justice of the King's Bench, or at the home of Richard FitzAlan, 3rd Earl of Arundel. Owain is then thought to have been sent to London to study law at the Inns of Court. He probably studied as a legal apprentice in London, for a period of seven years. He was possibly in London during the Peasants' Revolt of 1381. By 1384, he was living in Wales and married to Margaret Hanmer; their marriage took place 1383 in St Chad's Church, Holt, although they may have married at an earlier date in the late 1370s according to sources. They started a large family and Owain established himself as the squire of Sycharth and Glyndyfrdwy.

Glyndŵr joined the king's military service in 1384 when he undertook garrison duty under the renowned Welshman Sir Gregory Sais, or Sir Degory Sais, on the English–Scottish border at Berwick-upon-Tweed. His surname Sais, meaning "Englishman" in Welsh refers to his ability to speak English, not common in Wales at the time. In August 1385, he served King Richard II under the command of John of Gaunt, again in Scotland. In 1386, he was called to give evidence at the High Court of Chivalry, the Scrope v Grosvenor trial at Chester on 3 September that year. In March 1387, Owain fought as a squire to Richard FitzAlan, 4th Earl of Arundel, in the English Channel at the defeat of a Franco-Spanish-Flemish fleet off the coast of Kent. Upon the death in late 1387 of his father-in-law, Sir David Hanmer, knighted earlier that same year by Richard II, Glyndŵr returned to Wales as executor of his estate. Glyndŵr served as a squire to Henry Bolingbroke (later Henry IV of England), son of John of Gaunt, at the short, sharp Battle of Radcot Bridge in December 1387. From the year 1384 until 1388 he had been active in military service and had gained three full years of military experience in different theatres and had seen first-hand some key events and noteworthy people.

King Richard was distracted by a growing conflict with the Lords Appellant from this time on. Glyndŵr's opportunities were further limited by the death of Sais in 1390 and the sidelining of FitzAlan, and he probably returned to his stable Welsh estates, living there quietly for ten years during his forties. The bard Iolo Goch ("Red Iolo"), himself a Welsh lord, visited Glyndŵr in Sycharth in the 1390s and wrote a number of odes to Owain, praising Owain's liberality, and writing of Sycharth, "Rare was it there / to see a latch or a lock."

Welsh Revolt

In the late 1390s, a series of events began to push Owain towards rebellion, in what was later to be called the Welsh Revolt, the Glyndŵr Rising or (within Wales) the Last War of Independence. His neighbour, Baron Grey de Ruthyn, had seized control of some land, for which Glyndŵr appealed to the English Parliament. Owain's petition for redress was ignored. Later, in 1400, Lord Grey informed Glyndŵr too late of a royal command to levy feudal troops for Scottish border service, thus enabling him to call the Welshman a traitor in London court circles. Lord Grey had stature in the Royal court of King Henry IV. The English Courts refused to hear, or the case was delayed because Lord Grey prevented Owain's letter from reaching the King.

On 16 September 1400, Owain Glyndŵr instigated a 15-year Welsh Revolt against the rule of King Henry IV of England. With the use of guerrilla tactics, the Welsh troops managed to inflict a series of defeats on the English forces and captured key castles across Wales, rapidly gaining control of most of the country. News of the rebellion's success spread internationally across Europe and Glyndwr began receiving naval support from Scotland and Brittany, He also received the support of King Charles VI of France who agreed to send French troops and supplies to aid the rebellion. In 1403 a Welsh army including a French contingent assimilated into forces mainly from Morgannwg and the Rhondda Valleys region commanded by Owain Glyndŵr, his senior general Rhys Gethin and Cadwgan, Lord of Glyn Rhondda, defeated a large English invasion force reputedly led by King Henry IV himself at the Battle of Stalling Down in Glamorgan, South Wales. Medieval historian Iolo Morganwg wrote that while raiding English held territories in Wales, Glyndŵr and his rebels took from the powerful and rich and distributed the loot among the poor, hence why Glyndŵr is often also viewed as a Robin Hood figure.

Sources state that Glyndŵr was under threat because he had written an angry letter to Lord Grey, boasting that lands had come into his possession, and he had stolen some of Lord Grey's horses, and believing Lord Grey had threatened to "burn and slay" within his lands, he threatened retaliation in the same manner. Lord Grey then denied making the initial threat to burn and slay and replied that he would take the incriminating letter to Henry IV's council and that Glyndŵr would hang for the admission of theft and treason contained within the letter. The deposed king, Richard II, had support in Wales, and in January 1400 serious civil disorder broke out in the English border city of Chester after the public execution of an officer of Richard II.These events led to Glyndŵr formally assuming his ancestral title of Prince of Powys on 16 September 1400 at his Glyndyfrdwy estate. With a small band of followers which included his eldest son, his brothers-in-law, and the Bishop of St Asaph in the town of Corwen, possibly in the church of SS Mael & Sulien, he launched an assault on Lord Grey's territories. After a number of initial confrontations between King Henry IV and Owain's followers in September and October 1400, the revolt, a prequel to the War of the Roses (Lancastrian and Tudor dispute) began to spread. Much of northern and central Wales went over to Glyndŵr. Henry IV appointed Henry Percy – the famous "Hotspur" – to bring the country to order. The King and English parliament on 10 March 1401 issued an amnesty which applied to all rebels with the exception of Owain and his cousins, Rhys ap Tudur and Gwilym ap Tudur, sons of Tudur ap Gronw (forefather of King Henry VII of England). Both the Tudors were pardoned after their capture of Edward I's great castle at Conwy on 28 May 1401. In June, Glyndŵr scored his first major victory in the field at Mynydd Hyddgen on Pumlumon. Retaliation by Henry IV on the Strata Florida Abbey followed by October. The rebel uprising had occupied all of North Wales, labourers seized whatever weapons they could, farmers sold their cattle to buy arms, secret meetings were held everywhere, and bards "wandered about as messengers of sedition", castles fell into Glyndŵr's hands as he assumed the Prince of Wales title. Henry IV of England heard of a Welsh uprising at Leicester, Henry's army wandered North Wales to Anglesey, and drove out Franciscan friars who favoured Richard II, all the while Glyndŵr who was in hiding had his estate forfeited to John Beaufort, 1st Earl of Somerset. Glyndŵr had been offered a pardon on 10 March 1401 but rejected the plea. On 30 May Hotspur, having won a battle near 'Cadair Idris', left his command for the English army and began dealings with Glyndŵr. During this time in the spring of 1401, Glyndŵr appears in South Wales, and by Autumn the counties Gwynedd, Ceredigion (which temporarily submitted to England for a pardon) and Powys adhered to the rising against the English rule. Glyndŵr's attempts at stoking rebellion with help from the Scottish and Irish were quashed with the English showing no mercy and hanging some messengers.In 1401 and 1402, the English Parliament enacted the Penal Laws against Wales, designed to coerce submission in Wales, but the result was to create resentment that pushed many Welshmen into the rebellion. In the same year, Glyndŵr captured his archenemy, Baron Grey de Ruthyn. He held him for almost a year until he received a substantial ransom from Henry. In June 1402, Glyndŵr defeated an English force led by Sir Edmund Mortimer near Pilleth (Battle of Bryn Glas), where Mortimer was captured. Glyndŵr offered to release Mortimer for a large ransom but, in sharp contrast to his attitude to de Grey, Henry IV refused to pay. Mortimer's nephew could be said to have had a greater claim to the English throne than Henry himself, so his speedy release was not an option. In response, Mortimer negotiated an alliance with Glyndŵr and married one of Glyndŵr's daughters. It is also in 1402 that mention of the French and Bretons helping Owain was first heard. The French were certainly hoping to use Wales as they had used Scotland: as a base from which to fight the English.

Glyndŵr facing years on the run finally lost his estate in the spring of 1403, when Prince Henry as usual marched into Wales unopposed and burnt down his houses at Sycharth and Glyndyfrdwy, as well as the commote of Edeirnion and parts of Powys. Glyndŵr continued to besiege towns and burn down castles, for 10 days in July that year he toured the south and south-west Wales until all of the south joined arms in rebelling against English rule, these actions induced an internal rebellion against the King of England with the Percy's joining the rising. It is around this stage of Glyndŵr's life that Hywel Sele a cousin of the Welsh prince, attempted to assassinate Glyndŵr at the Nannau estate.

In 1403 the revolt became truly national in Wales. Royal officials reported that Welsh students at Oxford University and Cambridge University were leaving their studies to join Glyndŵr's. And also that Welsh labourers and craftsmen were abandoning their employers in England and returning to Wales. Owain could also draw on Welsh troops seasoned by the English campaigns in France and Scotland. Hundreds of Welsh archers and experienced men-at-arms left the English service to join the rebellion.

In 1404, Glyndŵr's forces took Aberystwyth Castle and Harlech Castle, then continued to ravage the south by burning Cardiff Castle. Then a court was held at Harlech and Gruffydd Young was appointed as the Welsh Chancellor. There had been communication to Louis I, Duke of Orléans in Paris to try (unsuccessfully) to open the Welsh ports to French trade.

Senedd: Crowning as prince of Wales 
By 1404 no less than four royal military expeditions into Wales had been repelled and Owain solidified his control of the nation. In 1404, he was officially crowned Prince of Wales and held a Senedd (parliament) at Machynlleth where he outlined his national programme for an independent Wales, which included plans such as building two national universities (one in the south and one in the north), re-introducing the traditional Welsh laws of Hywel Dda, and establishing an independent Welsh church. There were envoys from other countries including France, Scotland and the Kingdom of León (in Spain). In the summer of 1405, four representatives from every commote in Wales were sent to Harlech. Machynlleth may have been chosen due to its central location in Wales and the recently acquired possession of three nearby castles: Castell-y-Bere, Aberystwyth Castle and Harlech Castle. The current Parliament House in Machynlleth is associated with the 1404 Senedd but the present building is more recent. Local tradition is that the stones used came from the original 1404 building.

Tripartite indenture and the year of the French
In February 1405, Glyndŵr negotiated the "Tripartite Indenture" with Edmund Mortimer and Henry Percy, Earl of Northumberland. The Indenture agreed to divide England and Wales among the three of them. Wales would extend as far as the rivers Severn and Mersey, including most of Cheshire, Shropshire and Herefordshire. The Mortimer Lords of March would take all of southern and western England and the Percys would take the north of England.
Although negotiations with the lords of Ireland were unsuccessful, Glyndŵr had reason to hope that the French and Bretons might be more welcoming. He dispatched Gruffydd Yonge and his brother-in-law (Margaret's brother), John Hanmer, to negotiate with the French. The result was a formal treaty that promised French aid to Glyndŵr and the Welsh. The immediate effect seems to have been that joint Welsh and Franco-Breton forces attacked and laid siege to Kidwelly Castle. The Welsh could also count on semi-official fraternal aid from their fellow Celts in the then independent Brittany and Scotland. Scots and French privateers were operating around Wales throughout Owain's war. Scottish ships had raided English settlements on the Llŷn Peninsula in 1400 and 1401. In 1403, a Breton squadron defeated the English in the Channel and devastated Jersey, Guernsey and Plymouth, while the French made a landing on the Isle of Wight. By 1404, they were raiding the coast of England, with Welsh troops on board, setting fire to Dartmouth and devastating the coast of Devon.

1405 was the "Year of the French" in Wales. A formal treaty between Wales and France was negotiated. On the continent, the French pressed the English as the French army invaded English Plantagenet Aquitaine. Simultaneously, the French landed in force at Milford Haven in west Wales, and attempted to capture Pembroke Castle before they were bought off. The combined forces of French and Welsh marched through Herefordshire and on into Worcestershire to Woodbury Hill. They met the English army just ten miles from Worcester. The armies took up battle positions daily and viewed each other from a mile without any major action for eight days. Then, for reasons that have never become clear, the Welsh retreated, and so did the French shortly afterwards.

The Pennal Letter: the vision of an independent Wales 

By 1405, most French forces had withdrawn after politics in Paris shifted toward peace with the Hundred Years' War continuing between England and France. On 31 March 1406 Glyndŵr wrote a letter to be sent to Charles VI King of France during a synod at the Welsh Church at Pennal, hence its name. Glyndŵr's letter requested maintained military support from the French to fend off the English in Wales. Glyndŵr suggested that in return, he would recognise Benedict XIII of Avignon as the Pope. The letter sets out the ambitions of Glyndŵr of an independent Wales with its own parliament, led by himself as Prince of Wales. These ambitions also included the return of the traditional law of Hywel Dda, rather than the enforced English law, establishment of an independent Welsh church as well as two universities, one in south Wales, and one in north Wales. Following this letter, senior churchmen and important members of society flocked to Glyndŵr's banner and English resistance was reduced to a few isolated castles, walled towns, and fortified manor houses.

Glyndŵr's Great Seal and a letter handwritten by him to the French in 1406 are in the Bibliothèque nationale de France in Paris. This letter is currently held in the Archives Nationales in Paris. Facsimile copies involving specialist ageing techniques and moulds of the famous Glyndwr seal were created by The National Library of Wales and were presented by the then heritage minister Alun Ffred Jones, to six Welsh institutions in 2009. The royal great seal from 1404 was given to Charles IV of France and contains images and Glyndŵr's title –  – 'Owain, by the grace of God, Prince of Wales'.

The rebellion falters
During early 1405, the Welsh forces, who had until then won several easy victories, suffered a series of defeats. English forces landed in Anglesey from Ireland and would over time push the Welsh back until the resistance in Anglesey formally ended toward the end of 1406.

Following the intervention of French forces, battling ensued for years, and in 1406 Prince Henry restored fines and redemption for Welsh soldiers to choose their own fate, prisoners were taken after the battle, and castles were restored to their original owners, this same year a son of Glyndŵr died in battle. By 1408 Glyndŵr had taken refuge in the North of Wales, having lost his ally from Northumberland.

Despite the initial success of the revolution, in 1407 the superior numbers, resources, and wealth that England had at its disposal eventually began to turn the tide of the war, and the much larger and better equipped English forces gradually began to overwhelm the Welsh. In times of war, the English changed their strategy. Rather than focusing on punitive expeditions as favoured by his father, the young Prince Henry adopted a strategy of economic blockade. Using the castles that remained in English control, he gradually began to retake Wales while cutting off trade and the supply of weapons. By 1407 this strategy was beginning to bear fruit, even though by this time Owain's rebel soldiers had achieved victories over the King's men as far as Birmingham, where the English were in retreat. and by 1409 they had reconquered most of Wales. Later, then on 21 December 1411 the King of England issued pardons to all Welsh except their leader and Thomas of Trumpington (until 9 April 1413 from which Glyndŵr was no longer excepted). Edmund Mortimer died in the final battle, and Owain's wife Margaret along with two of his daughters (including Catrin) and three of Mortimer's granddaughters were imprisoned in the Tower of London. They were all to die in the Tower in 1413 and were buried at St Swithin, London Stone. 

Glyndŵr fought on until he was cornered and under siege at Harlech Castle; but he managed to escape capture by disguising himself as an elderly man, sneaking out of the castle and slipping past the English military blockade in the darkness of the night. Glyndŵr retreated to the Welsh wilderness with a band of loyal supporters; he refused to surrender and continued the war with guerrilla tactics such as launching sporadic raids and ambushes throughout Wales and the English borderlands. In 1409, it was the turn of Harlech Castle to surrender.

Glyndŵr remained free, but he had lost his ancestral home and was a hunted prince. He continued the rebellion, particularly wanting to avenge his wife. In 1410 Owain led a suicide raid into rebel-controlled Shropshire, and in 1412 he carried out one of the final successful raiding parties with his most faithful soldiers and cut through the King's men; in an ambush in Brecon, he captured, and later ransomed, a leading Welsh supporter of King Henry's, Dafydd Gam. This was the last time that Owain was seen alive by his enemies, although it was claimed he took refuge with the Scudamore family. The last documented sighting of him was in 1412 when he ambushed the king's men in Brecon and captured and ransomed a leading supporter of King Henry's. In the autumn, Glyndŵr's Aberystwyth Castle surrendered while he was away fighting. But by then things were changing. Henry IV died in 1413 and his son King Henry V began to adopt a more conciliatory attitude to the Welsh. Royal pardons were offered to the major leaders of the revolt and other opponents of his father's regime. As late as 1414, there were rumours that the Herefordshire-based Lollard leader Sir John Oldcastle was communicating with Owain, and reinforcements were sent to the major castles in the north and south.

Glyndŵr twice ignored offers of a pardon from the new king Henry V of England, and despite the large rewards offered for his capture, Glyndŵr was never betrayed by the Welsh. His death was recorded by a former follower in the year 1415, at the age of approximately 56.

Disappearance

Nothing certain is known of Glyndŵr after 1412. Despite enormous rewards being offered, he was neither captured nor betrayed. He ignored royal pardons. Tradition has it that he died and was buried possibly in the church of Saints Mael and Sulien at Corwen close to his home, or possibly on his estate in Sycharth or on the estates of his daughters' husband: Kentchurch in south Herefordshire or Monnington in west Herefordshire.

In his book The Mystery of Jack of Kent and the Fate of Owain Glyndŵr, Alex Gibbon argues that the folk hero Jack of Kent, also known as Siôn Cent – the family chaplain of the Scudamore family – was, in fact, Owain Glyndŵr himself. Gibbon points out a number of similarities between Siôn Cent and Glyndŵr (including physical appearance, age, education, and character) and claims that Owain spent his last years living with his daughter Alys, passing himself off as an ageing Franciscan friar and family tutor. There are many folk tales of Glyndŵr donning disguises to gain an advantage over opponents during the rebellion.

Death 
Adam of Usk, a one-time supporter of Glyndŵr, made the following entry in his Chronicle in the year 1415: "After four years in hiding, from the king and the realm, Owain Glyndŵr died, and was buried by his followers in the darkness of night. His grave was discovered by his enemies, however, so he had to be re-buried, though it is impossible to discover where he was laid." Thomas Pennant writes that Glyndwr died on 20 September 1415 at the age of 61 (which would place his birth at approximately 1354).

In 1875, the Rev. Francis Kilvert wrote in his diary that he saw the grave of "Owen Glendower" in the churchyard at Monnington "[h]ard by the church porch and on the western side of it ... It is a flat stone of whitish-grey shaped like a rude obelisk figure, sunk deep into the ground in the middle of an oblong patch of earth from which the turf has been pared away, and, alas, smashed into several fragments."

In 2006, Adrien Jones, the president of the Owain Glyndŵr Society, said, "Four years ago we visited a direct descendant of Glyndŵr, a John Skidmore, at Kentchurch Court, near Abergavenny. He took us to Mornington Straddle, in Herefordshire, where one of Glyndŵr's daughters, Alice, lived. Mr Skidmore told us that he (Glyndŵr) spent his last days there and eventually died there... It was a family secret for 600 years and even Mr Skidmore's mother, who died shortly before we visited, refused to reveal the secret. There's even a mound where he is believed to be buried at Mornington Straddle." Historian Gruffydd Aled Williams suggests in a 2017 monograph that the burial site is in the Kimbolton Chapel near Leominster, the present parish church of St James the Great which used to be the chapelry of Leominster Priory, based upon a number of manuscripts held in the National Archives. Although Kimbolton is an unexceptional and relatively unknown place outside of Herefordshire, it is closely connected to the Scudamore family. Given the existence of other links with Herefordshire, its place within the mystery of Owain Glyndŵr's last days cannot be discounted. , his final resting place remains uncertain.

Legacy
Previously, George Owen, in his book A Dialogue of the present Government of Wales, written in 1594, commented on the topic of the "Cruell lawes against Welshmen made by Henrie the ffourth" in his attempts to quell the revolt. But it was not until the late 19th century that Glyndŵr's reputation was revived, when the Cymru Fydd movement recreated Glyndŵr as the father of Welsh nationalism.

Glyndŵr is now remembered as a national hero and numerous small groups have adopted his symbolism to advocate independence or nationalism for Wales. For example, during the 1980s, a group calling themselves "Meibion Glyndŵr" claimed responsibility for the burning of English holiday homes in Wales. The creation of the National Assembly for Wales brought him back into the spotlight and in 2000 celebrations were held all over Wales to commemorate the 600th anniversary of Glyndŵr's revolt, including a historic reenactment at the Millennium National Eisteddfod of Wales, Llanelli 2000.

Glyndwr was described by Fidel Castro as the first effective guerrilla leader. It has been suggested that Castro, who may have kept books about the Welshman, and Che Guevara copied some of Glyndwr's methods in the Cuban Revolution.

During the First World War, Prime Minister David Lloyd George unveiled a statue to Glyndŵr in Cardiff City Hall. A statue of Glyndŵr by the sculptor Simon van de Put was installed in The Square in Corwen in 1995, and in 2007 it was replaced with a larger equestrian statue by Colin Spofforth. A monument was erected in Machynlleth in 2000, on the 600th anniversary of the beginning of the Glyndwr Rising.

Literature
After Glyndŵr's death, there was little resistance to English rule. The Tudor dynasty saw Welshmen become more prominent in English society. In Henry IV, Part 1, Shakespeare portrays him as Owen Glendower (the name has since been adopted as the anglicised version of Owain Glyndŵr), wild and exotic; a man who claims to be able to "call spirits from the vasty deep", ruled by magic and tradition in sharp contrast to the more logical but highly emotional Hotspur. Shakespeare further notes Glyndŵr as being "not in the roll of common men" and "a worthy gentleman,/Exceedingly well read, and profited/ In strange concealments, valiant as a lion/And as wondrous affable and as bountiful/As mines of India." (Henry IV, Part I, 3.1). And his enemies describe him "that damn'd magician", which was in reference to having the weather on his side in battle.

Glyndŵr later acquired mythical status as the hero awaiting a call to return and liberate his people. Thomas Pennant, in his Tours in Wales (1778, 1781 and 1783), searched out and published many of the legends and places associated with the memory of Glyndŵr. Glyndŵr has been featured in a number of works of modern fiction, including most notably John Cowper Powys' novel Owen Glendower (1941), and Edith Pargeter's 1972 publication A Bloody Field by Shrewsbury.

Glyndŵr's name in public use 

The Owain Glyndwr Hotel in Corwen is a historic inn. An earlier building had been a monastery and church dating from the age of Glyndŵr in the 14th century, although the current building mostly dates from the 18th century. The waymarked long distance footpath Glyndŵr's Way runs through Mid Wales near to his homelands. At least two ships and one locomotive have been named after Glyndŵr.
 In 1808, the Royal Navy launched a 36-gun fifth-rate frigate, . She served in the Baltic Sea during the Gunboat War where she participated in the seizure of Anholt Island, and then in the Channel. Between 1822 and 1824, she served in the West Africa Squadron (or 'Preventative Squadron') chasing down slave ships, capturing at least two.
 Owen Glendower, an East Indiaman, a Blackwall frigate built-in 1839.
In 1923, a 2-6-2T Vale of Rheidol locomotive was named after Glyndŵr. The locomotive is still operational and was one of a few used by British Rail until it was privatised.

Following the death of Glyndŵr, he acquired mythical status as the hero awaiting a call to return and liberate his people in the classic Welsh mythical role "Y Mab Darogan". Glyndŵr came second to Aneurin Bevan in the 100 Welsh Heroes poll of 2003/4. Stamps were issued with his likeness in 1974 and 2008, and streets, parks, and public squares were named after him throughout Wales. There is a campaign to make 16 September, the date Glyndŵr raised his standard, a public holiday in Wales, including by Dafydd Wigley in 2021.

An annual award for achievement in the arts and literature, the Glyndŵr Award, is named after Glyndŵr. In 2008, what is now Glyndŵr University was established in Wrexham, Wales, originally established as the Wrexham School of Science and Art in 1887. Glendower Residence, at the University of Cape Town in South Africa, was named after Owain Glyndŵr. The residence was opened in 1993 having previously been the Glendower Hotel. The hall of residence houses 135 male students.

Glyndŵr's personal standard (the quartered arms of Powys and Deheubarth rampant) began to be seen all over Wales on commercial products, and also flags used at rugby union games and other sporting events. RGC 1404 (Rygbi Gogledd Cymru/North Wales Rugby) rugby union team is named in honour of the year Owain Glyndŵr was crowned Prince of Wales.

Banners and coat of arms

Marriage and issue

Owain married Margaret Hanmer, also known by her Welsh name Marred ferch Dafydd, daughter of Sir David Hanmer of Hanmer, early in his life.

Owain's daughter Alys had secretly married Sir John Scudamore, the King's appointed Sheriff of Herefordshire. Somehow he had weathered the rebellion and remained in office. It was rumoured that Owain finally retreated to their home at Kentchurch.
A grandchild of the Scudamore's was Sir John Donne of Kidwelly, a successful Yorkist courtier, diplomat and soldier, who after 1485 made an accommodation with his fellow Welshman, Henry VII. Through the Donne family, many prominent English families are descended from Owain, including the House of de Vere, successive holders of the title Earl of Oxford, and the Cavendish family (Dukes of Devonshire). Glyndŵr's daughters Janet and Margaret married respectively Sir John de Croft and Sir Richard Monnington, in Herefordshire.

Owain's sons were either taken prisoner or died in battle and had no issue. Gruffudd, born about 1375, was captured by the English, confined in Nottingham Castle, and taken to the Tower of London in 1410. He died in prison of bubonic plague about 1412. Maredudd, whose date of birth is unknown, was still living in 1421 when he accepted a pardon. Little is known about Madog, Thomas, and John. Owain had additional illegitimate children: David, Gwenllian, Ieuan, and Myfanwy.

Lineage
Owain Glyndŵr's ancestry :

See also

 Buildings associated with Owain Glyndŵr
 Welsh heraldry
 Welsh Seal
 List of people who disappeared

References

Notes

Sources

Further reading
 – 

 –  
 –

External links

 Cefn Caer
Two letters of Owain Glyndŵr, from Adam of Usk

 
 

 
 

14th-century births
1410s deaths
1410s missing person cases
14th-century Welsh lawyers
15th-century monarchs in Europe
15th-century Welsh military personnel

Owain
Missing person cases in Wales
Monarchs of Powys
Welsh princes
Year of birth uncertain
Year of death uncertain